Amirovo (Ämir) is a rural locality (a selo) in Karansky Selsoviet, Buzdyaksky District, Bashkortostan, Russia. The population was 482 as of 2010. There are 7 streets.

Geography 
Amirovo is located 14 km north of Buzdyak (the district's administrative centre) by road. Ishmenevo is the nearest rural locality.

References 

Rural localities in Buzdyaksky District